Hakon Alexander Reuter was a sailor from Sweden, who represented his country at the 1928 Summer Olympics in Amsterdam, Netherlands.

Sources 
 

Sailors at the 1928 Summer Olympics – 6 Metre
Olympic sailors of Sweden
1899 births
1969 deaths
Swedish male sailors (sport)
Royal Gothenburg Yacht Club sailors
Sportspeople from Gothenburg